Dust Up was a Canadian reality television series produced by Paperny Entertainment and Prairie Threat Entertainment that aired in 2011 on History Television. The series follows three crop dusters in Nipawin, Saskatchewan (73-year-old Bud Jardine, his son Brennan Jardine, and rookie pilot Travis Karle) as they compete for work and mount sometimes-perilous crop dusting expeditions. Each plane is outfitted with four cameras to capture the action.

References

External links
 The Official 'Dust Up' Site
 

History (Canadian TV network) original programming
2010s Canadian reality television series
2011 Canadian television series debuts
2011 Canadian television series endings
Aviation television series